Henry Nash Smith (September 29, 1906 – June 6, 1986) was a scholar of American culture and literature. He was co-founder of the academic discipline "American studies". He was also a noted Mark Twain scholar, and the curator of the Mark Twain Papers. The Handbook of Texas reported that an uncle encouraged Smith to read at an early age, and that the boy developed an interest in the works of Rudyard Kipling, Robert L. Stevenson and Mark Twain.

Life
Smith was born in Dallas, Texas to a father, an accountant who was a native of Kentucky, and a mother who was a native of Alabama. In 1922, he enrolled in Southern Methodist University (SMU), where he studied under John Hathaway McGinnis.  In 1926, Smith received his Bachelor's degree at SMU, then enrolled at Harvard University, where he earned the Master of Fine Arts degree. He returned to SMU in 1927, where he began teaching in the English Department. He was also appointed as editor of the Southwest Review, a position he held until 1937. 

He left SMU again in 1941 to begin teaching as a Professor of English and history at the University of Texas at  Austin, Texas (UT-A), where he became a friend with J. Frank Dobie. Smith was reportedly happy with his work, his colleagues and his students. However, turmoil embroiled UT in the years following the end of World War II in 1945. He wrote a paper entitled, "The Controversy at the University of Texas, 1939–1945," which he presented to the student committee on academic freedom on August 13, 1945.

Smith accepted a position as professor of English at the University of Minnesota (UMinn) in 1947, where he joined the American Studies program. Gossett wrote that while still employed by UMinn, Smith took an active role in protests defending academic freedom at the University of Washington.  This became the basis for publishing an essay titled "Legislatures, Communists and State Universities, in 1949, arguing against firing faculty members who had become members of the communist party.

The Smith family left Minneapolis in 1953, when Henry accepted a position at the University of California, Berkeley (UCB). He served as chairman of the UCB English Department from 1957 to 1961, and also served a term as national president of the Modern Language Association in 1969. A decade after he moved to Berkeley, Smith immersed himself in a series of political actions, including the Free Speech movement and the anti-Vietnam war protests. He retired from UCB in 1974, and was classified as President Emeritus.

Smith taught at the University of Minnesota, at the University of Texas, at Southern Methodist University, and, from 1953 to 1960, at the University of California, Berkeley, later becoming professor emeritus.

His Virgin Land: The American West as Symbol and Myth, published in (1950) gave its name to the Myth and Symbol School, and in academia was the basis of the paradigm of American Studies until the 1980s. Since it was based on his Ph.D. thesis and was the basis of a History of American Civilization course at Harvard University, its publication has been seen as the birth of that field. The book's topic was the collective perception of the 19th-century American West. Smith used sources such as dime novels and other items of popular culture. He was associated with Leo Marx and John William Ward.

In his 1957 essay "Can American Studies Develop a Method?" (American Quarterly), frequently anthologized, Smith advocated influential objectives and methodological views for the Myth and Symbol School.

Smith married Elinor Lucas in 1956. They had three children: Harriet Elinor Smith, Janet Carol Smith, and Mayne Smith. 

Smith died at the age of 79 on June 6, 1986, following an automobile accident on May 30, 1986, near Elko, Nevada.

Awards and honors 
 1981 elected member of the American Philosophical Society
 1974 Guggenheim Fellowship - Awarded to individuals who have already demonstrated exceptional capacity for productive scholarship or exceptional creative ability in the arts.]
 1961 elected member of the American Academy of Arts and Sciences
 1951 Bancroft Prize
 1950 John H. Dunning prize - Prize established in 1929 by the American Historical Association for the best book in history related to the United States. Smith was the 12th author to receive this biennial award.

Works 
 Virgin Land: The American West as Symbol and Myth, 1950 (reprint Vintage Books, 1957; Harvard University Press, 1970)
 Mark Twain of the Enterprise, 1957
 Mark Twain: The Development of a Writer, Belknap Press, 1962
 Mark Twain's Fable of Progress: Political and Economic Ideas in A Connecticut Yankee, Rutgers University Press, 1964
 Popular Culture and Industrialism, 1865-1890, 1967
 Democracy and the Novel, 1978

Notes

Additional reading 
John William Ward 1955. Andrew Jackson, Symbol for an Age. New York: Oxford University Press.
John William Ward. 1969 Red, White, and Blue: Men, Books, and Ideas in American Culture . New York: Oxford University Press
Marx, Leo (1964). The Machine in the Garden: Technology and the Pastoral Ideal in America. New York: Oxford University Press.[6]
Marx, Leo (1989). The Pilot and the Passenger: Essays on Literature, Technology, and Culture in the United States. New York: Oxford University Press
Ward, David C. 2004 Charles Willson Peale: Art and Selfhood in the Early Republic Berkley, California : University of California Press (John William Ward son's book, who went on to become Senior Historian at the National Portrait Gallery)
Lewis, R. W. B. 1955. The American Adam; Innocence, Tragedy, and Tradition in the Nineteenth Century. [Chicago]: University of Chicago Press.
Matthiessen, F. O. 1949. American Renaissance: Art and Expression in the Age of Emerson and Whitman. Harvard, Boston
Meyers, Marvin 1957 The Jacksonian Persuasion: Politics and Belief Stanford Press, California
Hofstadter, Richard. 1955. The Age of Reform: from Bryan to F.D.R.

References

External links 
 etext of Virgin Land
 Synopsis of Virgin Land
 American literature, culture, and ideology: essays in memory of Henry Nash Smith, Beverly Rose Voloshin (ed), P. Lang, 1990, 
 Guide to the Henry Nash Smith Papers at The Bancroft Library

See also
John William Ward (professor)

1906 births
1986 deaths
University of California, Berkeley faculty
Harvard University alumni
Southern Methodist University alumni
Southern Methodist University faculty	
University of Minnesota faculty
University of Texas at Austin faculty
American social scientists
American literary critics
20th-century American non-fiction writers
Bancroft Prize winners
People from Dallas
People from Berkeley, California
Members of the American Philosophical Society
Presidents of the Modern Language Association